The Crystal Cup is a 1927 American drama film directed by John Francis Dillon and written by Gerald Duffy and Mort Blumenstock. It is based on the 1925 novel The Crystal Cup by Gertrude Atherton. The film stars Dorothy Mackaill, Rockliffe Fellowes, Jack Mulhall, Clarissa Selwynne, Jane Winton and Edythe Chapman. The film was released on October 16, 1927, by First National Pictures.

Cast      
Dorothy Mackaill as Gita Carteret
Rockliffe Fellowes as John Blake
Jack Mulhall as Geoffrey Pelham
Clarissa Selwynne as Mrs. Pleyden
Jane Winton as Polly Pleyden
Edythe Chapman as Mrs. Carteret

References

External links
 

1927 films
1920s English-language films
Silent American drama films
1927 drama films
First National Pictures films
Films directed by John Francis Dillon
American silent feature films
American black-and-white films
Films based on American novels
Films based on works by Gertrude Atherton
1920s American films